The 1987 Virginia Slims of California was a women's tennis tournament played on indoor carpet courts in San Francisco, California in the United States and was part of the Category 3 tier of the 1987 WTA Tour. It was the 16th edition of the tournament and was held from February 9 through February 15, 1987. Third-seeded Zina Garrison won the singles title.

Finals

Singles
 Zina Garrison defeated  Sylvia Hanika 7–5, 4–6, 6–3

Doubles
 Hana Mandlíková /  Wendy Turnbull defeated  Zina Garrison /  Gabriela Sabatini 6–4, 7–6(7–4)

References

External links
 Official website
 ITF tournament edition details
 Tournament draws

Virginia Slims of California
Silicon Valley Classic
Virginia Slims of California
Virginia Slims of California
Virginia Slims of California